Guðmundur Gunnarsson (born 29 October 1945) is an Icelandic electrician who served as the leader of the Icelandic Electricians' Union, Rafiðnaðarsamband Íslands (RSÍ) from 1993 until 2011. He is the father of the singer Björk (Björk Guðmundsdóttir).

Guðmundur's parents were Gunnar Guðmundsson and Hallfríður Guðmundsdóttir. He qualified as a journeyman electrician in 1966. He graduated from the  Technical College of Iceland in 1969.

He was a municipal representative of the Sjálfstæðisflokkurinn (Independence Party) in Reykjavík from 1994 to 1998 and Chairman of the Nordic Federation of Electricians' Unions from 1994 to 1996 and from 2004 to 2006.

Guðmundur has written numerous textbooks for electricians.

References

Living people
Gudmundur Gunnarsson
1945 births
Gudmundur Gunnarsson
Place of birth missing (living people)
Electricians
Gudmundur Gunnarsson